Altai, until 2019 known as Zyryan or Zyryanovsk is a district of East Kazakhstan Region in eastern Kazakhstan. The administrative center of the district is the town of Zyryanovsk. Population:

References

Districts of Kazakhstan
East Kazakhstan Region